The Smith & Wesson Model 22 is a 6-shot, double-action, large frame revolver chambered in .45 ACP using moon clips. It's a refined commercial version of the M1917 revolver first issued during World War I.

Additional 
Built around Smith & Wesson's large N frame, it was originally sold as the Model 1950 and is normally fitted with a 5½" barrel with no under lug and fixed combat sights. The Models 25 and Model 26 are the "Target" models. The Model 22 was succeeded by the stainless steel Smith & Wesson Model 625.

The Model 22 was re-introduced as the second limited production Thunder Ranch revolver in 2007.  This gun features a 4" match barrel with under lug, fixed sights, cocobolo grips, and an internal lock.  The popularity of this revolver led S&W to continue its production in its classic line as the 22-4. It is quite an accurate revolver and has a smoother trigger pull than the original, most likely due to improvements in production. A limited production run of bright nickel-plated, non–Thunder Ranch models were made. Only select firearm dealers were considered to be allowed to sell this particular model. A certain number of Model 22s were made with a case-hardened (case color) finish by Turnbull Restorations. These came in both 4" and (limited) 5.5" Barrel lengths. The finish done by Turnbull is a true case-hardened finish and not the chemical wash finish found on firearms by other manufacturers.

Use of moon clips 

The Model 22 was designed to fire .45 ACP pistol cartridges with use with moon clips. It will head-space the .45 ACP cartridge in the chambers without use of moon clips, but since the extractor cannot engage the rimless cartridge, the empty shells must be ejected with a cleaning rod or pencil. It may also use .45 Auto Rim as they were designed for revolvers chambered in .45 ACP using moon clips. The Model 22 may also fire the newer .45 GAP cartridge, but only with the use of moon clips.

References

.45 ACP revolvers
Revolvers of the United States
Smith & Wesson revolvers